Momiji is the Japanese name for Acer palmatum, the Japanese maple tree.

Momiji may also refer to:

People
 Momiji Nishiya (西矢 椛, born 2007), Japanese skateboarder
 Momiji Yamamura (山村 紅葉, born 1960), Japanese actress

Characters
 Momiji (oni), an oni from Japanese mythology
 Momiji (Ninja Gaiden), a character in the Ninja Gaiden games
 Momiji Fujimiya, a character from the manga Blue Seed
 Momiji Fuyou, a character from the visual novel Shuffle!
 Momiji Inubashiri, a character from Touhou Project
 Momiji Oouka, a character from Detective Conan
 Momiji Sohma, a character from the manga Fruits Basket
 Momiji Mochizuki, a character from New Game!
 Momiji Momi, a character from The 100 Girlfriends Who Really, Really, Really, Really, Really Love You

Other uses
 Momiji Dolls, a collection of dolls and accessories
 Momiji mark, a sign used on vehicles in Japan to indicate "aged person at the wheel"
 "Momiji", a traditional Japanese song by Teiichi Okano
 Leaf peeping or momijigari, leaf viewing

Japanese feminine given names